Blackmon is an English surname. Notable people with the surname include:

Barbara Blackmon (born 1955), American politician
Brenda Blackmon, American anchor
Charlie Blackmon (born 1986), American baseball outfielder
Clarence Blackmon (1942–2011), American basketball coach
Cliff Blackmon (1914–1995), American baseball pitcher 
Diamanté Blackmon (born 1991), known professionally as GORDO, Guatemalan-American record producer and disc jockey
Don Blackmon (born 1958), American football coach player
Douglas A. Blackmon (born 1964), American writer and Pulitzer Prize winner
Edafe Blackmon (born 1971), African-American actor
Edward Blackmon Jr. (born 1947), American attorney and politician
Eugene Blackmon Jr. (1959–1988), American firefighter
Evelyn Blackmon (1924–2014), American politician
Fred L. Blackmon (1873–1921), American politician
Harold Blackmon (born 1978), American football player
Isaiah Blackmon (born 1996), American basketball player
James Blackmon Sr. (born 1964), American basketball coach and player
James Blackmon Jr. (born 1995), American basketball player
Julian Blackmon (born 1998), American football defensive back
Julie Blackmon (born 1966), American photographer
Justin Blackmon (born 1990), American football wide receiver
Kenneth R. Blackmon (born c. 1967), American rear admiral
Larry Blackmon (born 1956), American musician
Robert Blackmon (born 1967), American football safety
Roland Blackmon (1928–2017), American hurdler
Roosevelt Blackmon (born 1974), American football cornerback
Rosemary Barnsdall Blackmon (1921–1983), American writer and magazine editor
Shaw Blackmon (born 1973), American politician
Tiffany Blackmon (born 1984), American sports reporter 
Traci D. Blackmon, African American minister
Tray Blackmon (born 1985), Canadian football linebacker
Tristan Blackmon (born 1996), American soccer player
Will Blackmon (born 1984), American football player
William Joshua Blackmon (1921–2010), American street preacher and artist

Fictional characters:
Mars Blackmon, character portrayed by Spike Lee in his film She's Gotta Have It and several Air Jordan commercials that he directed.

Places
Blackmon Peak, Custer County, Idaho

See also
Blackman (surname)

English-language surnames